State Road 399 (NM 399) is a  state highway in the US state of New Mexico. NM 399's northern terminus is at U.S. Route 84 (US 84) and US 285 in Sombrillo, and the southern terminus is a continuation as County Route 120 (CR 120) at CR 127 in La Mesilla.

Major intersections

See also

References

399
Transportation in Santa Fe County, New Mexico
Transportation in Rio Arriba County, New Mexico